Edmund Beardsley Underwood (1853 – April 12, 1928) was a Commodore in the United States Navy.  Born in March 1853, at Humboldt Bay, in California,  he was the son of U.S. Army Lieutenant Edmund Underwood and Mary Moore Beardsley.  He graduated from the United States Naval Academy in 1873.  He was Commandant (and therefore Acting Governor) of American Samoa from May 5, 1903 to January 30, 1905. He retired in 1910.

References

1853 births
1928 deaths
Governors of American Samoa
United States Naval Academy alumni
Military personnel from California
United States Navy officers